Proceedings of the Linnean Society or Proceedings of the Linnaean Society may refer to
Proceedings of the Linnean Society of London
Proceedings of the Linnaean Society of New York
Proceedings of the Linnean Society of New South Wales